DanceSport BC (DSBC), founded in 1968, is the governing body for competitive ballroom dance in British Columbia and Yukon, Canada.  It is a member of the Canadian Amateur DanceSport Association.

DSBC is a non-profit, volunteer-run organization that promotes ballroom dancing in British Columbia.  Among its numerous functions, it publishes a newsletter, Dancin', every two months and a dancers' guide, Steppin' Out, each year.

DanceSport BC sanctions several annual competitions, including:

 SnowBall Classic - Vancouver (IDSF world-ranking competition) (February).  Hosted by DanceSport BC.
 UBC Gala Ball - Vancouver (March).  Hosted by the University of British Columbia Dance Club.
 Island Fantasy Ball (including the BC Closed Championships) - Nanaimo (May).  Hosted by the Nanaimo Ballroom Dance Society.
 Dance Pacifica - Victoria (June).  Hosted by the Victoria Ballroom Dance Society.
 Pro-Am Fiesta - Richmond (June).  Hosted by the Grand Ballroom.
 Okanagan DanceSport Festival - Penticton (July).
 Crystal Invitational DanceSport Festival - Vancouver (September or October).  Hosted by the Crystal Ballroom.
 The Grand Ball - Richmond (November).  Hosted by the Grand Ballroom.

External links
DanceSport BC web site
Active member of Dancesport BC from 1995 to 1 June 2004

Dancesport in Canada
1968 establishments in British Columbia
Sports organizations established in 1968
Sports governing bodies in British Columbia